Mohamed Larbi Arouri (born 13 May 1983) is a professional Tunisian football defender. His last known club was FC Ordabasy in the Kazakhstan Premier League.

Honours
Baltic League: 2008
Lithuanian Cup: 2008
A Lyga: 2006, 2007
CAF Confederation Cup: 2006
Tunisian League Cup: 2005

External links
 

1983 births
Living people
Tunisian footballers
Tunisian expatriate footballers
Expatriate footballers in Lithuania
Expatriate footballers in Kazakhstan
Expatriate footballers in Ukraine
Espérance Sportive de Tunis players
AS Marsa players
AS Kasserine players
FBK Kaunas footballers
FC Metalurh Zaporizhzhia players
FC Oleksandriya players
FC Ordabasy players
Ukrainian Premier League players
Kazakhstan Premier League players

Association football fullbacks